Guyanancistrus is a genus of suckermouth armored catfishes.

Species
There are currently 8 recognized species in this genus:
 Guyanancistrus brevispinis (Heitmans, Nijssen & Isbrücker, 1983)
 Guyanancistrus brownsbergensis Mol, Fisch-Muller & Covain, 2018
 Guyanancistrus longispinis (Heitmans, Nijssen & Isbrücker, 1983)
 Guyanancistrus megastictus Fisch-Muller, Mol & Covain, 2018
 Guyanancistrus nassauensis Mol, Fisch-Muller & Covain, 2018
 Guyanancistrus niger (Norman, 1926)
 Guyanancistrus tenuis Fisch-Muller, Mol & Covain, 2018
 Guyanancistrus teretirostris Fisch-Muller, Mol & Covain, 2018

References

Fish of South America
Hypostominae
Ray-finned fish genera